Laviolette was a provincial electoral district in the Mauricie region of Quebec, Canada that elects members to the National Assembly of Quebec. It includes the city of La Tuque and its urban agglomeration, some parts of the city of Shawinigan, and various other municipalities.

It was created for the 1931 election from part of Champlain electoral district.

In the change from the 2001 to the 2011 electoral map, it gained Lac-aux-Sables and Notre-Dame-de-Montauban from Portneuf electoral district.

Following the change in the 2017 electoral map, the riding was dissolved into the new ridings of Laviolette–Saint-Maurice and Champlain.

It was named after the founder of Trois-Rivières in 1634, the Sieur de Laviolette.

Members of the Legislative Assembly / National Assembly

Election results

|-
 
|Liberal
|Julie Boulet
|align="right"|11,645
|align="right"|59.13
|align="right"|

|}

See also

Grand-Mère
History of Canada
History of Quebec
La Tuque, Quebec
Mauricie
Politics of Canada
Politics of Quebec
Saint-Maurice—Champlain

References

External links
Information
 Elections Quebec

Election results
 Election results (National Assembly)

Maps
 2011 map (PDF)
 2001 map (Flash)
2001–2011 changes (Flash)
1992–2001 changes (Flash)
 Electoral map of Mauricie region
 Quebec electoral map, 2011

Former provincial electoral districts of Quebec
La Tuque, Quebec
Shawinigan